Brenton Awa is an American politician serving as a member of the Hawaii Senate for the 23rd district. He assumed office on November 8, 2022.

Early life and education 
Awa was born in Kaʻaʻawa, Hawaii, and graduated from Kahuku High & Intermediate School in 2004.

Career 
Prior to entering politics, Awa was a news anchor for KITV. Three years after joining KITV, he became the anchor of Good Morning Hawaii. Awa was elected to the Hawaii Senate in November 2022.

References 

Living people
Hawaii state senators
Hawaii Republicans
American television news anchors
People from Honolulu County, Hawaii
Year of birth missing (living people)